Muhammad Subhan Qureshi (born 1959) is a biologist from Khyber Pakhtunkhwa, Pakistan, who is the founder and chief patron of Dairy Science Park. He also worked as a dean at the University of Agriculture, Peshawar, Pakistan, and as adjunct professor at Charles Sturt University, Wagga Wagga, Australia.

Education
Qureshi came from a traditional, intellectual family, and belongs to the Bannu District of Khyber Pakhtunkhwa. After completing his early education in Bannu, Qureshi graduated from the University of Veterinary and Animal Sciences, Lahore in 1982 and then joined the provincial Livestock Department as a veterinary officer in Peshawar. Meanwhile, he joined the University of Agriculture, Faisalabad and completed his MSc and PhD degrees in animal reproduction.

Career
In 1998, in light of his findings under his doctoral thesis on judicial utilization of livestock resources, Qureshi prepared Chief Minister’s Livestock Development Plan on advice of the provincial Chief Minister Sardar Mehtab Abbasi. Later in 2003, Qureshi's plan was also approved by the Chief Minister Akram Khan Durrani. In 2005, Qureshi joined the University of Agriculture, Peshawar as a full professor, and he was raised to the status of Dean of the Faculty of Animal Husbandry and Veterinary Sciences. He contributed as Dairy Expert in a Pak-Australia Dairy project. He also worked as Visiting Professor and then Adjunct Professor at Charles Sturt University, Wagga Wagga, Australia. To introduce business incubation concepts, Qureshi organized a series of conferences on Dairy Science Park. Three international workshops on it were held in 2011, 2013, and 2015, respectively, at the University of Agriculture, Peshawar, each of which was attended by over 500 participants from academia, business and farming community, and development and government organizations of regional countries. The fourth DSP conference was held in November 2017 at Selçuk University in Konya, Turkey, with participation from Konya Metropolitan Municipality and Selçuk University, and in cooperation with 13 other countries. In the fourth DSP conference in Konya, it was announced that two technoparks will be established in Mardan and Quetta, Pakistan, to promote the use of modern technology and develop dairy sector in the region.

Publications

See also
Dairy Science Park

References

Pakistani biologists
Pashtun people
People from Bannu District
1959 births
Living people
Academic staff of Charles Sturt University
University of Agriculture, Faisalabad alumni
Academic staff of the University of Agriculture, Peshawar